The 2018 European Rowing Junior Championships took place in Gravelines, France, between 26 and 27 May 2018.

Medal summary

Men

Women

Medal table

References

External links
Official website
Results 

European Rowing Junior Championships
2018 European Rowing Junior Championships
European Rowing Junior Championships
Junior European Rowing
European Rowing Junior Championships